Alfonzo McKinnie (born September 17, 1992) is an American professional basketball player for the Capitanes de Ciudad de México of the NBA G League. He played college basketball for Eastern Illinois University and University of Wisconsin–Green Bay.

Early life and high school career
McKinnie grew up on Chicago's West Side. Growing up just in East Garfield Park only about 15 minutes from the United Center, he describes himself as an enthusiastic supporter of the Chicago Bulls in youth. McKinnie played his first two years of high school basketball at Chicago's Curie Metropolitan High School. He played his final high school season as a starter at Marshall Metropolitan High School, during which he earned All-Red West Conference honors averaging 11.2 points and 8.5 rebounds per game.

College career
McKinnie was not a big scorer and lightly recruited during his one year at Marshall HS. He got a chance to play at Eastern Illinois. As a sophomore he averaged 10.2 points and 7.0 rebounds per game. After his second year, he transferred to Wisconsin-Green Bay, where he tore his meniscus at the end of his redshirt season. Later, he tore his meniscus again and had it removed. He finished his college career averaging 7.1 points and 5.1 rebounds in 96 games.

Professional career

East Side Pirates (2015–2016)
After going undrafted in the 2015 NBA Draft, McKinnie started his career with the East Side Pirates in Luxembourg's semi-professional second division, where he became the go-to scorer, averaging 26 points per game.

Rayos de Hermosillo (2016)
On May 21, 2016, he signed with the Mexican team Rayos de Hermosillo. An old friend, former North Dakota forward Emmanuel Little, suggested he join the CIBACOPA. McKinnie became a strong player on the squad. He helped lead the Rayos to the regular-season title and the final series before falling four games to two against the Náuticos de Mazatlán.

Windy City Bulls (2016–2017)
In September 2016, McKinnie paid 175 dollars for a tryout with the Windy City Bulls of the NBA G League. On October 30, 2016, he made Bulls’ G-League roster. He played well for the Bulls in 2016.

Toronto Raptors (2017–2018)
On July 9, 2017, McKinnie signed with the Toronto Raptors. He made his NBA debut on October 19, 2017, playing in a single minute in their 117–100 win over the Chicago Bulls. During his rookie season, he received multiple assignments to Raptors 905, Toronto's NBA G League affiliate. On July 17, 2018, the Raptors waived McKinnie.

Golden State Warriors (2018–2019)
McKinnie signed with the Golden State Warriors for the 2018–19 season. He ultimately earned a spot on the team’s opening night roster. He recorded his career first double-double (19 points, 10 rebounds, both career highs) in 27 minutes off the bench on October 29 against the Chicago Bulls. McKinnie averaged 4.7 points a game for the season while playing 72 games. The Warriors advanced to the 2019 NBA Finals, where they lost to the Toronto Raptors in six games. On October 18, 2019, the Warriors waived McKinnie.

Cleveland Cavaliers (2019–2020)
On October 21, 2019, the Cleveland Cavaliers claimed McKinnie off waivers. On January 6, 2020, he was waived by the Cavaliers. On January 9, the Cavaliers signed him to a 10-day contract. On January 23, McKinnie was re-signed to a second 10-day contract. On February 8, 2020, the Cleveland Cavaliers announced that they had signed McKinnie to a multi-year contract.

Los Angeles Lakers (2020–2021)
On November 22, 2020, McKinnie, along with Jordan Bell, was traded to the Lakers in exchange for JaVale McGee. On August 4, 2021, he was waived by the Lakers.

Capitanes de Ciudad de México (2021)
On October 25, 2021, McKinnie signed with the Capitanes de Ciudad de México of the NBA G League. In 10 games, he averaged 24.1 points, 9.8 rebounds and 1.5 assists.

Chicago Bulls (2021–2022)
On December 10, 2021, McKinnie signed a 10-day contract with his hometown team, the Chicago Bulls, due to numerous players on the team testing positive for COVID-19. On December 20, he signed a second 10-day contract. McKinnie described the move to the Chicago Bulls as "the biggest dream coming true". On December 26, McKinnie was signed for the rest of the season. On February 19, 2022, he was waived.

Return to Capitanes de Ciudad de México (2022–present)
On November 4, 2022, McKinnie was named to the opening night roster for the Capitanes de Ciudad de México.

Career statistics

NBA

Regular season

|-
| align="left" | 
| align="left" | Toronto
| 14 || 0 || 3.8 || .533 || .333 || .667 || .5 || .1 || .1 || .1 || 1.5
|-
| align="left" | 
| align="left" | Golden State
| 72 || 5 || 13.9 || .487 || .356 || .563 || 3.4 || .4 || .3 || .2 || 4.7
|-
| align="left" | 
| align="left" | Cleveland
| 40 || 1 || 14.8 || .427 || .215 || .710 || 2.8 || .4 || .6 || .2 || 4.6
|-
| align="left" | 
| align="left" | L.A. Lakers
| 39 || 0 || 6.6 || .516 || .410 || .556 || 1.4 || .2 || .2 || .0 || 3.1
|-
| style="text-align:left;"|2021–22
| style="text-align:left;"|Chicago
| 17 || 3 || 12.1 || .393 || .333 || .250 || 1.9 || .3 || .1 || .2 || 3.5
|- class="sortbottom"
| style="text-align:center;" colspan="2"|Career
| 182 || 9 || 11.6 || .467 || .326 || .583 || 2.5 || .3 || .3 || .1 || 4.0

Playoffs

|-
| align="left" | 2019
| style="text-align:left;"| Golden State
| 22 || 1 || 10.7 || .441 || .313 || .400 || 2.3 || .2 || .1 || .0 || 3.0
|-
| align="left" | 2021
| style="text-align:left;"| L.A. Lakers
| 2 || 0 || 6.0 || .000 || .000 || — || .5 || .0 || .0 || .0 || .0
|- class="sortbottom"
| style="text-align:center;" colspan="2"| Career
| 24 || 1 || 10.3 || .419 || .294 || .400 || 2.1 || .2 || .1 || .0 || 2.8

College

|-
| style="text-align:left;"| 2010–11
| style="text-align:left;"| Eastern Illinois
| 25 || 5 || 11.8 || .545 || – || .531 || 3.6 || .2 || .5 || .2 || 3.6
|-
| style="text-align:left;"| 2011–12
| style="text-align:left;"| Eastern Illinois
| 29 || 28 || 23.8 || .567 || – || .722 || 7.0 || .4 || .6 || .8 || 10.2 
|-
| style="text-align:left;"| 2013–14
| style="text-align:left;"| Green Bay
| 9 || 0 || 12.8 || .429 || .462 || .833 || 2.8 || .2 || .3 || .4 || 4.6
|-
| style="text-align:left;"| 2014–15
| style="text-align:left;"| Green Bay
| 33 || 20 || 21.6 || .453 || .328 || .508 || 5.3 || .2 || .5 || .5 || 8.0
|- class="sortbottom"
| style="text-align:center;" colspan="2"| Career
| 96 || 53 || 18.9 || .506 || .351 || .622 || 5.2 || .2 || .5 || .5 || 7.2

Source:

Personal life
He is the son of Elisa Bryant and Alfonzo McKinnie, Sr. In 2018, during his first stop in Chicago with the Warriors, he signed papers to buy his mother a house,  and introduced his parents at the Warriors team dinner after he helped Golden State blow out the Bulls.

He was previously engaged to Johanna Leia.

References

External links
 
 Green Bay Phoenix bio
 Eastern Illinois Panthers bio
 
 

1992 births
Living people
American expatriate basketball people in Canada
American expatriate basketball people in Luxembourg
American expatriate basketball people in Mexico
American men's 3x3 basketball players
American men's basketball players
Basketball players from Chicago
Capitanes de Ciudad de México players
Chicago Bulls players
Cleveland Cavaliers players
Eastern Illinois Panthers men's basketball players
Golden State Warriors players
Green Bay Phoenix men's basketball players
Los Angeles Lakers players
Raptors 905 players
Rayos de Hermosillo players
Small forwards
Toronto Raptors players
Undrafted National Basketball Association players
Windy City Bulls players